The Metropolitan Cathedral of Our Lady of Apparition Also Cascavel Cathedral Is a Catholic church and home to the Archdiocese of Cascavel, in the state of Paraná in Brazil.

The 10 of June 1952 the Parish of Our Lady of Apparition (Aparecida) was created, that became official patron of the municipality by the Law 201/62.

Its construction, between Brasil Avenue and Rio Grande South Street, began in 1974, after the solemn transport of the sacred image of the ancient cathedral (located to the right of the current Cathedral), with the aim of being the new Church of the municipality.

On May 5, 1978, with the finished work, the Diocese of Cascavel was created, becoming the parish church and then in the cathedral. On October 16, 1979, the diocese was elevated to an Archdiocese, and the church to Metropolitan Cathedral.

See also
List of cathedrals in Brazil
Roman Catholicism in Brazil

References

Roman Catholic cathedrals in Paraná (state)
Roman Catholic churches completed in 1978
20th-century Roman Catholic church buildings in Brazil